Tagliavini is an Italian surname. Notable people with the surname include:

Ferruccio Tagliavini (1913–1995), Italian opera singer
Gabriela Tagliavini (born 1968), Argentine film director
Heidi Tagliavini (born 1950), Swiss diplomat
Luigi Ferdinando Tagliavini (1929–2017), Italian organist, harpsichordist, musicologist and composer
Roberto Tagliavini (born 1976), Italian operatic bass
Solange Tagliavini (born 1985, Argentine handball player
Vasco Tagliavini (1937–2019), Italian footballer

Italian-language surnames